Ockbrook & Borrowash Cricket Club is an amateur cricket club based in Ockbrook, Derbyshire, England. The club has a history dating back to the mid 19th century.

Ground
The home ground is located on Victoria Avenue in Ockbrook, Derbyshire and has two pitches, an all-weather pitch and a two lane, all-weather net facility. The 1st and 2nd XI teams use the Victoria Avenue pitch, rated by the DCCL as a Grade A+ ground, and the 3rd and 4th XI use the pitch in the field behind the pavilion, rated as a Grade A ground.

History
History of cricket in the village of Ockbrook dates back to the mid nineteenth century, where a match report was recorded between Ockbrook and "Sawley Club" in the Derby and Chesterfield Reporter on the 27th October 1843. However, the official club records state the establishment of Ockbrook & Borrowash CC to be 1850. It is not clear where the original club ground was, but by 1898, the club acquired the use of the present ground on land adjoining the Queens Head off Victoria Avenue, the same year the club joined the Sandiacre and Ilkeston District league. During the 1950s and 60s, concerted efforts were made to improve the ground facilities and the image and fortunes of the club began to steadily improve. The club won the Butterly Cup in 1972, its first trophy for many years. Shortly afterwards, the club entered the Derby and District League, doing well enough to enter Division 1 in 1974, and becoming Div 1 runner-up and League Cup winners in 1974; Div 1 winners in 1975; Div 1 winners and League cup runner-up in 1976. In the early 1980s the old pavilion was damaged by fire, resulting in a new pavilion opening in 1985. In 1999, Ockbrook & Borrowash CC became the first champions of the newly formed Premier Division of the Derbyshire County Cricket League. After subsequent improvements to the ground, gaining a Grade A rating, the adjoining ground behind the pavilion was added in 2002. The pavilion was extended in 2004, followed by the addition of a scorebox in 2008.

The club currently has 4 senior teams competing in the Derbyshire County Cricket League and a long established and very successful junior training section that play competitive cricket in the Erewash Young Cricketers League.

Club performance
The Derbyshire County Cricket League competition results showing the club's positions in the league (by Division) since 1999.

The Mansfield and District Cricket League competition results showing the club's positions in the league by Section (Division) since 2013.

The Derbyshire Cricket Board Indoor Competition results showing the club's positions in the league (by Division) since 2017.

Club honours

Events on film
  17 year old Gary Ballance playing for Derbyshire club side Ockbrook and Borrowash in the national T20 cup.
  Ben De Vos Interview During the 3rd Team T20 Semi-Final 17th July 2016 by Matt Cassar
  Josh Clark Interview after the OBCC T20 Final 2016 by Matt Cassar
  George Morgan Interview after the OBCC T20 Final 2016 by Matt Cassar

See also
 Club cricket

References

External links
 Official Club website
 The Club Play-Cricket website
 Ockbrook & Borrowash Cricket Club YouTube
 Derbyshire County Cricket League Official Play-Cricket website

English club cricket teams
Cricket in Derbyshire
1850 establishments in England
Club cricket